Adelaide Railway Station is the central terminus of the Adelaide Metro railway system. All lines approach the station from the west, and it is a terminal station with no through lines, with most of the traffic on the metropolitan network either departing or terminating here. It has nine platforms, all using broad gauge track. It is located on the north side of North Terrace, west of Parliament House. The Adelaide Casino occupies part of the building that is no longer required for railway use. Until 1984, Adelaide station was also the terminus for regional and interstate passenger trains, but there are no longer any regular regional train services in South Australia, and all interstate services are now handled at Adelaide Parklands Terminal.

History

Early growth

Adelaide's first railway station opened on the current North Terrace site in 1856. It served the broad gauge line between Adelaide and Port Adelaide, which was the first government-owned and operated steam railway in the British Empire. The first passenger train departed from Adelaide station on 19 April 1856, carrying the Governor of South Australia and various dignitaries to a celebratory lunch at Port Adelaide. The original Adelaide station handled all passenger, freight and livestock traffic at the North Terrace site. Livestock was unloaded adjacent to the markets and abattoirs, which were opposite the Newmarket Hotel, on the corner of West Terrace. In 1865, the station yard covered an area of 55,000 square metres (13 acres).

The Port line opened for public service on 21 April 1856. It was single track, with intermediate stations at Bowden, Woodville and Alberton and terminated at Port Dock station (now closed). There were six trains per day in each direction, and two on Sundays. A second line opened to Smithfield (near Gawler) on 1 June 1857, the predecessor of today's Gawler line. This diverged from the Port line at a junction in the north parklands, and was extended to Kapunda in 1860, and Burra by 1870, both important copper mining towns in the early days of the colony.

The next line into the station was built by the Holdfast Bay Railway Company and opened on 24 May 1880. This branched off the main line where today's Belair and Seaford lines separate from the Outer Harbor and Gawler lines. It ran via Mile End and Plympton to Glenelg, and should not be confused with the other railway from South Terrace to Glenelg, which later became the Glenelg tram line. To cope with increasing traffic, interlocked signals and points were installed in 1875, and the Port line was upgraded to double track in 1881.

The South Line through the Adelaide Hills was opened to Aldgate on 14 March 1883, and extended to Nairne (November 1883) and Bordertown (May 1886). The first through train between Adelaide and Melbourne, the Intercolonial Express, ran on 19 January 1887, and was the first intercapital rail journey in Australia without a change of trains at a break-of-gauge station.

Early 20th century

With the basic framework of lines in place, the South Australian Railways continued building branch lines to promote settlement and agricultural development of the state's hinterland. Most of this expansion was complete by the early years of the 20th century and the resulting increase in traffic caused troublesome congestion in the vicinity of Adelaide station. In an attempt to cope with this, the original 1856 station buildings were demolished and replaced in 1900.

The South line was double tracked as far as Mitcham in 1908, and suburban trains ran to a new terminus at Clapham. The first section of the route that became the Seaford line opened from Goodwood Junction to Marino in 1913, and further extended to Willunga by 1918, this forming the Willunga line. On the north side of the city, a separate pair of tracks was built from the junction of the Port and North lines in the parklands through to Adelaide station yard, including a new bridge across the River Torrens.

In 1912, Mile End Goods Yard and engine sheds opened, and the Gaol Loop was built to allow freight trains to access the new yards at Mile End, bypassing Adelaide station. At the same time the livestock markets and abattoirs were relocated to Pooraka in the north of the metropolitan area, still countryside at the time. This allowed the area immediately around Adelaide station to concentrate on passenger and parcels traffic, and the old goods shed was then converted into a platform for Glenelg line trains. Adelaide station yard was also re-signalled in July 1915, using American-style three-position semaphore signals. This was the first installation of an electric signalling system in South Australia and was subsequently extended along the main lines of the South Australian Railways.

Webb era

The period from 1922-1930 was known as the Webb era on South Australian Railways. Under the leadership of a new Railways Commissioner, William Alfred Webb, South Australian Railways began a massive rehabilitation programme. Worn-out infrastructure, under-powered steam locomotives, undersized rolling stock and outdated operating systems were all modernised and upgraded along essentially American lines.

Among the many improvements that Webb championed, two of the best remembered are the introduction of new powerful steam locomotives and the rebuilding of Adelaide station. Nineteen designs were submitted and considered for the new station. The winner was a design proposed by local architects Daniel Garlick and Herbert Jackman. The initial plan had forward-thinking provisions for extra platforms (which were never built) to serve Commonwealth Railways trains, on the assumption that its standard gauge line would be extended from Port Augusta and Port Pirie into Adelaide. The foundation stone of the new station building was laid on 24 August 1926, and the building was completed in 1928.

The new station comprised a massive sandstone building in neo-classical style. The upper three storeys housed the railways administration, which had previously been scattered in various buildings around the city. The concourse had many facilities to cater for long distance travellers as well as daily commuters - a dining room, hairdressers, and refreshment rooms. Of particular note was the enormous domed Marble Hall, which served as a grand and dignified main waiting room, and is now incorporated into the Adelaide Casino. The new station had 13 platforms, each covered by an individual canopy to alleviate the problems of smoke and fumes previously endured with an overall roof. The cost of the rebuilding greatly exceeded the original budget and the project became a source of great controversy within South Australia as the state came close to bankruptcy with the onset of the Great Depression.

Post World War II

Patronage of country rail services declined through the 1950s and 60s as car ownership became more widespread. However, much of rural South Australia still retained daily passenger trains. Many of these services were operated by air-conditioned Bluebird Railcars, which had been introduced by the South Australian Railways from 1954 onwards. The following destinations were served from Adelaide in 1965:
Bute / Kadina / Wallaroo / Moonta
Port Pirie Junction (connection with Commonwealth Railways’ Trans-Australian Railway line to Kalgoorlie)
Hamley Bridge / Balaklava
Blyth / Gladstone / Wilmington
Riverton / Burra / Terowie (connection to Peterborough & Broken Hill)
Kapunda / Eudunda / Robertstown
Nuriootpa / Angaston / Truro
Murray Bridge / Tailem Bend / Barmera / Loxton / Waikerie
The Overland to Melbourne
Naracoorte / Mount Gambier / Kingston SE
Mount Barker / Strathalbyn / Victor Harbor / Milang
Morphett Vale / McLaren Vale / Willunga
In March 1978, South Australia Railways was divided between two owners. The Federal Government owned Australian National (AN) took over ownership and operation of all country lines outside the Adelaide metropolitan area. The State Government owned State Transport Authority (STA) retained the suburban routes around Adelaide, including ownership and operation of Adelaide station. ANl's longer distance trains continued to arrive and depart from Adelaide station for several years, paying an access charge to the STA, until AN's new Keswick Passenger Terminal opened on 18 May 1984, a kilometre or two west of the Adelaide city centre in an industrial suburb. Adelaide station is now served only by suburban trains.

Renewal
The years 1985 to 1987 saw the biggest change at Adelaide station since the rebuilding of the 1920s. The Adelaide Station and Environs Redevelopment (ASER) project involved:
Refurbishment of much of the exterior of the heritage-listed station building and conversion of the interior to a casino (the main building had become underutilised as railway operations shrank and AN moved its headquarters to a separate building at Keswick).
Construction of the Hyatt Regency hotel (now the InterContinental Adelaide) over the eastern part of the station site adjacent to the station building.
Construction of the Adelaide Convention Centre, Exhibition Hall and an office block over the central and western parts of the station site.
Partial relocation and reduction of platforms; Platfoms 1-2 and 12-13 were demolished while 9 to 11 were rebuilt 80 metres (260 ft) shorter. The remaining Platforms 3 to 11 were renumbered, becoming Platforms 1 to 9. The platforms became effectively underground and a special extraction system is needed to remove the exhaust fumes from the diesel railcars.

The track layout in the station yard was modified and resignalled in 1987/88, and operation of points and signals transferred to a new control centre overlooking the railcar depot and station. This resignalling resulted in closure of the two signal cabins that controlled movements in the station area – Adelaide Station Cabin (near Morphett Street bridge) and Wye Cabin, at the divergence of the South and Port/North lines. Adelaide Station Cabin was demolished, but the Wye Cabin building is heritage-listed and still stands, although derelict.

Adelaide's main railcar depot was located just outside the station at North Terrace. In 2008 it was announced that the depot would be moved to a new site at Dry Creek, freeing up the Adelaide site for the new Royal Adelaide Hospital. The Dry Creek depot opened in February 2011, and the City depot closed soon after. In January 2013, the station closed for a month-long shutdown in connection with the rail electrification of the Seaford railway line. A set of escalators was recently added to the southern entrance of the railway station and the adjoining staircase was refurbished, enabling the station to handle larger numbers of people.

On 28 February 2020, Renewal SA announced a revitalisation programme of the station building, projected to take about three years to complete. A new entrance at the northern end would be created, featuring vaulted ceilings, and a public artwork by installation artist James Geurts. In addition to enhancing the architectural features of the building, and upgrading the North Terrace frontage, an expansion of food and retail tenancies, along with cultural experiences, would create a hub for people to meet and spend time there, changing the social atmosphere.

Services by platform

Gallery

Notes

References

External links

Railway stations in Adelaide
Railway stations in Australia opened in 1856
Sandstone buildings in Australia
South Australian Heritage Register
Adelaide Park Lands